Edward William Hake (April 7, 1904 – September 12, 1978) was an American football player. A native of Michigan, he played college football at the University of Pennsylvania and was a consensus selection at the tackle position on the 1927 College Football All-America Team. He was also elected as the captain of the 1927 Penn Quakers football team.

In 1940, Hake was employed as an insurance broker and was living in Philadelphia with his wife, Celeste, and their son, Tucker. He died of a heart attack, on September 12, 1978 in Perkiomenville, Pennsylvania, at the age of 74.

References

1904 births
1978 deaths
American football tackles
Penn Quakers football players
All-American college football players
Players of American football from Michigan